Gordon Selkirk Currie (born 18 October 1933) is a Canadian bobsledder. He competed in the two-man and the four-man events at the 1964 Winter Olympics.

References

1933 births
Living people
Canadian male bobsledders
Olympic bobsledders of Canada
Bobsledders at the 1964 Winter Olympics
Sportspeople from Montreal